Nicolae Zamfir (born 26 April 1967) is a Romanian former football defender.

International career
Nicolae Zamfir played four friendly games for Romania, making his debut in 2–0 away victory against Spain.

Honours
Universitatea Craiova
Divizia A: 1990–91
Cupa României: 1990–91
FC U Craiova
Cupa României: 1992–93

Notes

References

External links

1967 births
Living people
Romanian footballers
Romania international footballers
Association football defenders
Liga I players
Cypriot First Division players
Faroe Islands Premier League players
CS Universitatea Craiova players
Alki Larnaca FC players
B36 Tórshavn players
Romanian expatriate footballers
Expatriate footballers in Cyprus
Romanian expatriate sportspeople in Cyprus
Romanian expatriate sportspeople in the Faroe Islands
Expatriate footballers in the Faroe Islands
People from Dolj County